Gene McNary (born September 14, 1935) is an American politician. He has served as the Commissioner of the Immigration and Naturalization Service, Executive Director of the Missouri Gaming Commission, and County Executive of St. Louis County.  He has also been a Republican candidate for Governor and Senator in Missouri.

Early life, education, and career
Gene McNary was born September 14, 1935 in Muncie, Indiana.  His father was and oil jobber and his mother worked with him.  McNary earned both his bachelor's and law degrees from Indiana University.  After law school McNary decided to move to St. Louis, where he joined the Lashly, Lashly & Miller law firm.

Early political career
In 1963, McNary began his career as a public servant by becoming assistant public defender. In 1966, he decided to run for Prosecuting Attorney of St. Louis County. He won the election and then went on to win reelection.  He then ran for County Executive of St. Louis County and won four terms in that position.  As county executive, he helped create a regional arts commission, merge the county and city hospitals into one regional facility, and create a regional convention and visitors bureau.  At the time he also served as the chairman of the East-West Gateway Coordinating Council.

In 1980 he was the Republican nominee for Senator. He narrowly lost to incumbent Senator Thomas Eagleton with a 52.0% to a 47.2% margin.  In 1984, McNary lost the Republican primary for Governor to Attorney General John Ashcroft. In 1989, McNary was appointed Commissioner of the Immigration and Naturalization Service by President George H. W. Bush.  He stayed in that position for over 3 years.

Private practice and later political career
In 1994, McNary went back to St. Louis and joined the Danna law firm. In 1998, he formed a law firm, McNary, Morris & Smalley, that specialized in immigration. While in private practice, he decided to run to represent Missouri's 2nd congressional district in the United States House of Representatives. The seat was open because the incumbent, Jim Talent, decided to run for governor. He narrowly lost the Republican primary to Todd Akin by about 50 votes.  In 2004, McNary ran to become St. Louis County Executive, a position vacated by Buzz Westfall's death.  He lost to Charlie Dooley with a margin of 45.8% to 52.9%.

In 2006, Governor Matt Blunt appointed McNary the Executive Director of the Missouri Gaming Commission.  McNary was in that position while St. Louis got two new casinos and while the $500 loss limit was ended.  McNary left his job at the Missouri Gaming Commission when two new Democratic appointees made it possible for him to be removed from his post.  He then ran for assessor of St. Louis County in 2012. The Republican Central Committee of St. Louis County chose L.K. "Chip" Wood as the Republican nominee for the position, in a 23-21 vote.  McNary has five children and nine grandchildren. One of his children is former Missouri State Rep. Cole McNary.

Electoral history

References 

Living people
Missouri Republicans
1935 births
County executives of St. Louis County, Missouri
Indiana University alumni
Methodists from Missouri
People from Muncie, Indiana